Ronald James Moran (18 February 1926 – 26 February 1997) was an Australian rules footballer who played a single game with North Melbourne in the Victorian Football League (VFL). 

He was he younger brother of Jack Moran who also played for North Melbourne.

Prior to playing with North Melbourne, Moran served in the Royal Australian Air Force during World War II.

Notes

External links 

1926 births
1997 deaths
Australian rules footballers from Melbourne
North Melbourne Football Club players
People from West Melbourne, Victoria
Royal Australian Air Force personnel of World War II
Military personnel from Melbourne